Ethan O'Reilly (born 27 December 1985) is a South African cricketer. He is a right-handed batsman and a right-arm fast bowler who plays for Gauteng. He was born in Port Elizabeth.

O'Reilly made his first-class debut for the team in 2008, in a game against Eastern Province. Batting from the tailend, O'Reilly scored a commendable 42 not out in his debut innings, partnering Dane Vilas to a ninth-wicket stand of 108 runs. He was included in the Eastern Province cricket team squad for the 2015 Africa T20 Cup.

References

External links
Ethan O'Reilly at Cricinfo

1985 births
South African cricketers
Living people
Eastern Province cricketers
Gauteng cricketers